The 2020–21 UC Riverside Highlanders men's basketball team represented the University of California, Riverside in the 2020–21 NCAA Division I men's basketball season. The Highlanders, led by first-year head coach Mike Magpayo, played their home games at SRC Arena in Riverside, California as members of the Big West Conference.

Previous season

The Highlanders finished the 2019–20 season 17–15, 6–9 in Big West play to finish sixth in the Big West Conference standings. Initially set to play UC Santa Barbara in the Big West Conference tournament, the tournament was cancelled due to the COVID-19 pandemic, ending the Highlanders' season.

On July 1, 2020, associate head coach Mike Magpayo was elevated to head coach of the program, replacing David Patrick, who had accepted an associate coach position at Arkansas. Magpayo, who is Filipino–American, thus became the first head coach of Asian descent in Division I men's basketball history.

Roster
Rather unusually, nine out of the fourteen players on UCR's roster during the 2020–21 season were from either Australia or New Zealand, with four players coming from the city of Melbourne alone, compared to only five who were from the United States.

Schedule and results 

|-
!colspan=9 style=| Regular season

|-
!colspan=12 style=| Big West tournament

Source:

References 

UC Riverside Highlanders men's basketball seasons
UC Riverside
UC Riverside Highlanders men's basketball
UC Riverside Highlanders men's basketball